Wahapov-Həyretdinov Räşit Wahap ulı (Tatar Cyrillic: , ; ; 1908–1962),  Räşit Wahapov, was a Tatar singer (tenor). People's Artist of TASSR (1957). In 1941-1962 he was a soloist of the Tatar Philharmonic Society. He performed Tatar folk songs, as well as songs by Sälix Säydäşev, Cäwdät Fäyzi, Mansur Mozaffarov and other composers.

The festival of Tatar song, named after Wahapov, is held every year.

Wahapov was born in a village called Aktuk.

References

Sources

1908 births
1962 deaths
Tatar people of the Soviet Union
Tatar musicians
Tatar-language singers
Soviet singers